Coleophora serratella is a moth of the family Coleophoridae. It is found in Europe (except the Balkan Peninsula), Japan (Hokkaido) and North America.

Description
Coleophora species have narrow blunt to pointed forewings and a weakly defined tornus The hindwings are narrow-elongate and very long-fringed. The upper surfaces have neither a discal spot nor transverse lines. Each abdomen segment of the abdomen has paired patches of tiny spines which show through the scales. The resting position is horizontal with the front end raised and the cilia give the hind tip a frayed and upturned look if the wings are rolled around the body. C. serratella characteristics include head light ochreous - fuscous. Antennae whitish, ringed with fuscous, more faintly or obsoletely towards apex, basal joint fuscous. Forewings rather dark fuscous, ochreous - tinged. Hindwings dark fuscous.
Only reliably identified by dissection and microscopic examination of the genitalia.

Life cycle
The moth flies in June depending on the location.

The larvae feed on birches, elms, alders, hazels, apples, Crataegus, Sorbus, willows, Comptonia peregrina and Quercus wislizenii. They create a strongly curved youth case. The adult case is a tubular leaf case. The mouth angle is about 30°. It is straw coloured. Larvae start feeding in September and continue to the end of October. They hibernate in their case, and resume feeding in April.

References

External links
 
 Coleophora serratella at UKmoths

serratella
Moths described in 1761
Moths of Europe
Moths of Japan
Moths of North America
Taxa named by Carl Linnaeus